William Jones Boone may refer to:

 William Jones Boone (father) (1811–1864), first Anglican missionary bishop of Shanghai
 William Jones Boone (son) (1845–1891), fourth Anglican missionary bishop of Shanghai

See also
William Boone (disambiguation)